George Maxwell Mensah (born 10 January 1997) is a Ghanaian football defender/midfielder playing for Castelvetro Calcio.

Career
Born in Ghanaian capital city of Accra Mensah grew up with his mother, sister and two brothers. As a child he started playing football at age 14 in the Accra football school. Here he was noticed by a Ghanaian prosecutor, who had contacts with Italian agents. From there begins his adventure in Europe. In January 2015, Mensah leaves his family and Ghana and moves to Italy by plane. His first audition was with the Primavera team of Sampdoria, followed by the transfer to Sorrento. He was registered by Taranto but made no appearances because of bureaucratic problems. In between he was registered for the youth team of Santo Agnello. Pino De Filippis discovered him and brought him to Vastese thus Mensah becoming one of the biggest talents of Group F. He became new player of Vastese at late August 2016. He made 29 appearances for Vastese in 2016–17.

During winter-break of 2017–18 season he joined FK Temnić Lipa Varvarin playing in the Serbian First League.

In summer 2018 he return to Italy and joined Castelvetro Calcio.

References

1997 births
Living people
Footballers from Accra
Ghanaian footballers
Association football defenders
Ghanaian expatriate footballers
Taranto F.C. 1927 players
Vastese Calcio 1902 players
Expatriate footballers in Italy
Serbian First League players
Expatriate footballers in Serbia
FK Temnić players